April is a short romance-drama film written and directed by Otar Iosseliani. The film was produced in 1961 in Iosseliani's early period while still in his native Georgia.

The film was screened out of competition at the 2000 Cannes Film Festival.

Cast
 Tatyana Chanturia as Mtsiya
 Gia Chiraqadze as Vadzha
 Akaki  Chikvaidze as neighbor

References

External links
 

Soviet short films
Soviet romantic comedy-drama films
Soviet black-and-white films
Georgian-language films
Films directed by Otar Iosseliani
1960s romantic comedy-drama films
Soviet-era films from Georgia (country)
Kartuli Pilmi films
1961 comedy films
1961 drama films
1961 films
Comedy-drama films from Georgia (country)
Short films from Georgia (country)